Ted Edwards (9 May 1884 – 29 September 1945) was an England-born American film actor of the silent era. Ted Edwards appeared in two of Charlie Chaplin's comedy shorts

He was born in Sheffield, Yorkshire, as Maurice Edward Burrell. He was an actor, known for Maniac, Fires of Youth (1924) and Polygamy (1936). He died on September 29, 1945, in Los Angeles, California, USA.

Maurice was one of nine children born to John Willian Burrell and his wife Sarah Ann Burrell.   John Burrell was a draper with a shop at 59 Snig Hill, Sheffield. In later life the family lived at 80 Kendal Road in Hillsborough, Sheffield.

Selected filmography 
 Ambrose's First Falsehood (1914)
 A Bath House Beauty (1914)
 Dough and Dynamite (1914)
 His Prehistoric Past (1914)
 Leading Lizzie Astray (1914)
 A Busy Day (1915)
 Tillie's Punctured Romance (1914)
 A Submarine Pirate (1915)
 A Dog's Life (1914) – Unemployed man
 Fatty's Faithful Fido (1915)
 Fatty's Plucky Pup (1915)
 Fatty's Tintype Tangle (1915)
 Fatty and Mabel at the San Diego Exposition (1915)
 Hearts and Planets (1915)
 Fatty's Reckless Fling (1915)
 Fatty's Chance Acquaintance (1915)
 Mabel and Fatty's Simple Life  (1915)
 When Love Took Wings (1915)
 Are Waitresses Safe? (1917)

References

External links 

1884 births
1945 deaths
American male film actors
American male silent film actors
20th-century American male actors
Burials at Rose Hills Memorial Park
British emigrants to the United States